Ricardo Hernández Hernández (1885 – death unknown) was a Cuban infielder in the Negro leagues and Cuban League in the 1900s and 1910s.

A native of Havana, Cuba, Hernández made his Negro leagues debut in 1908 with the Cuban Stars (West). He played five seasons with the Stars, and also played for the All Cubans in 1911. Hernández also played several seasons in the Cuban League, including five seasons with Habana and two more with Club Fé.

References

External links
  and Seamheads

1885 births
Date of birth missing
Year of death missing
Place of death missing
All Cubans players
Azul (baseball) players
Club Fé players
Cuban Stars (West) players
Habana players
Baseball infielders